Favoriter på svenska (Swedish for "Favorites in Swedish") was released on 10 May 2006 and is an album where Swedish pop singer Shirley Clamp sings covers in the Swedish language. The album peaked at number seven on the Swedish Albums Chart.

Track listing
När kärleken föds (It Must Have Been Love)
Öppna din dörr
I en annan del av världen
Jag kan nå dig (When I  love You)
Vindarna som bär (Wind Beneath My Wings)
Regn hos mig
I dina ögon (True Colors)
Tro
Hur sköra vi är (Fragile)
Om
Inget kan gå fel

Charts

Weekly charts

Year-end charts

References

2006 albums
Covers albums
Shirley Clamp albums